Blobbing is an outdoor water activity in which a participant sits on the end of a partly inflated air bag (known as a water trampoline or blob) and is launched into the water when another participant jumps onto the air bag from a platform on the opposite side. The activity is popular at summer camps in North America. Various tricks may also be performed while the participant is in the air. The recommended height for the tower is 15 feet above the water surface, or 10 feet above the air bag.

Blobbing Battle 
From 2011 the organizer blob-Europe.com arranged the first championships in Blobbing, called Blobbing Battle. This year only in Austria, from 2012 in other countries, too. Teams (2 Jumper & 1 Blobber)  battled against each other on a knock-out basis. The evaluation happens with help of height gauge and judges. Blobbing Battle 2011 takes place on 7 tourstops through Austria.

World Record 

References

External links 
 U.S. Headquarters and manufacturing plant
 Asia Hub for Blob jump activities
 European Headquarter

Water sports